Litesa E. Wallace (born 1978) is an American politician who served as a member of the Illinois House of Representatives for the 67th district from August 2014 to January 2019.

Early life and education 
Wallace was born in Chicago. She earned a Bachelor of Arts degree from Western Illinois University, followed by a Master of Arts in marriage and family counseling and a Ph.D. in educational psychology from Northern Illinois University.

Career

Illinois House of Representatives 
Wallace was appointed to the Illinois House of Representatives in August 2014 by the Winnebago County Democratic Party, succeeding Charles E. Jefferson. Wallace had previously served as chief of staff to Jefferson.

2018 Illinois gubernatorial campaign and aftermath 

Wallace ran for lieutenant governor of Illinois in the 2018 Democratic primary alongside State Senator Daniel Biss, replacing Biss's initial pick, Chicago alderman Carlos Ramirez-Rosa. In a video announcing the joint ticket, Wallace commented that she and Biss had both "fought for childcare assistance, a $15 minimum wage, to expand healthcare, and to make millionaires pay their fair share." Biss and Wallace lost the Democratic primary to J. B. Pritzker and his running mate Julianna Stratton.

In the 2020 Democratic presidential primary, Wallace was a supporter of Bernie Sanders' 2020 presidential campaign.

2022 congressional election 

In November 2021, Wallace declared her candidacy for Illinois's 17th congressional district in the 2022 election.

References

External links
 Illinois General Assembly Page
 Official Website Rep Litesa Wallace
 Litesa Wallace for Congress

1978 births
21st-century American politicians
21st-century American women politicians
African-American state legislators in Illinois
African-American women in politics
Candidates in the 2022 United States House of Representatives elections
Living people
Democratic Party members of the Illinois House of Representatives
Northern Illinois University alumni
Politicians from Rockford, Illinois
Western Illinois University alumni
Women state legislators in Illinois